Tchórzewski, feminine: Tchórzewska is a Polish surname. It is a toponymic surname derived from a location named Tchórzew. Notable people with this surname include:

 (1924-2004), Polish female World War II military commander
Ed Tchorzewski (1943-2008), Canadian politician 
Krzysztof Tchórzewski (b. 1950), Polish engineer and politician

Polish-language surnames
Toponymic surnames